Diego Calero (born 30 August 1940) is a former Colombian cyclist. He competed in the 1000m time trial at the 1960 Summer Olympics.

References

External links
 

1940 births
Living people
Colombian male cyclists
Olympic cyclists of Colombia
Cyclists at the 1960 Summer Olympics
Sportspeople from Cali